Evgeny Konobry (born August 17, 1985) is a Russian professional ice hockey goaltender who played for HC Spartak Moscow of the Kontinental Hockey League (KHL) during the 2010-11 season.

References

External links

Living people
HC Spartak Moscow players
Russian ice hockey goaltenders
1985 births